This page is a list of historically significant Art Deco and Moderne buildings in the Perth, Western Australia metropolitan area.

Commercial buildings

Apartments and residential buildings

Cinemas and theatres

Educational buildings

Hotels and pubs

Industrial buildings

Institutional buildings and facilities

Religious buildings

Public buildings and facilities

Sports buildings

Country buildings

Non Deco buildings of the era

Photo gallery

References

Perth
Perth
Art Deco